Chislehurst was a former house and former school building located in , Sydney, New South Wales, Australia. Completed in 1892 by the merchant and pastoralist John de Villiers Lamb, the former house was originally known as Maroomba.

History
In 1900, the house was bought from Lamb by a K. Weidlmann. Weidlmann sold the house in 1906 to Edward Carr Hordern, a member of the Hordern family.. It was renamed Chiselhurst after the birthplace of Carr Hordern's wife, Lillie. Hordern expanded the house significantly and lived there until his death in 1940. His widow and sister continued to live there until the house was vacated in 1954.

The property was then acquired by the NSW Department of Education as a site for Chatswood High School, which opened in 1959.

References 

1892 establishments in Australia
Houses in Sydney
Chatswood West, New South Wales
Horden family
Chatswood High School